The Jamia Millia Islamia attack refers to the forceful entry by Delhi police into the Jamia Millia Islamia university during a confrontation with student protesters that started outside the campus on 15 December 2019. Hundreds of police officers forcefully entered the campus and detained more than a hundred students during the confrontation with the protesters. The police used batons and tear gas to disperse protesters. The police also entered the university library and washrooms and in the process of the violence ransacked parts of it. The visuals of students being dragged and assaulted by the police were telecast by news channels. About two hundred people were injured and were admitted to AIIMS and the Holy Family Hospital.

Thousands of people protested outside the Delhi Police Headquarters immediately after the attack. Reactionary protests were held in all the major cities of India. The attack triggered widespread controversy and garnered international condemnation. The Human Rights Watch urged the Indian government to order a probe into the attack.

Background 
The Citizenship Amendment Act protests are a series of ongoing protests in India against the Citizenship Amendment Act, or CAA. The university of Jamia Millia Islamia became a center of the protest.

13 December protest 
On 13 December 2019, the students of Jamia Millia Islamia University undertook a march to the Parliament protesting against the CAA. They were prevented from going ahead by the police who used batons and tear gas to disperse the protesters leading to clashes with them. Fifty students were detained by the police after the clash. According to the students, police attacked the peaceful protesters with stones and batons, in which several students were injured. The students then retaliated with stones. Police denied the allegations claiming that after the protesters were prevented from taking their march forward they attacked the policemen with stones, after which the police used tear gas shells. Several students were injured in a baton charge.

Attack 
On the morning of 15 December 2019, more than two thousand students of Jamia joined the protests against CAA in Delhi. Jamia Millia Student Body and Jamia Millia Islamia Teacher's Association (JTA) condemned the violence that happened on the same day in Delhi and stated that no student or teacher was involved in the violence.

On 15 December, Delhi Police attacked students of Jamia Millia Islamia including Shaheen Abdullah, Chanda Yadav, Ladeeda Farzana and Aysha Renna at New Friends Colony.

At 6:46 pm on 15 December 2019, hundreds of police officers, during confrontations with protesters, forcefully entered the campus of Jamia, without the permission of college authority. The police used batons and tear gas on the protesting students. Nearly a hundred students were detained by the Delhi police and released at 3:30 am next morning. The visuals of students being dragged and assaulted by the police was telecast by news channels. Students from all across Delhi joined the agitation. About two hundred people were injured and were admitted to AIIMS and the Holy Family Hospital.

Attack on library 
The police fired tear gas canisters inside the main library. Students scrambled over desks and smashed windows to escape. In a video, released on 15 December 2019, it can be seen that the students who were taking refuge inside the library were trying to escape from the reading room where tear gas was fired.
Later, the police denied entering the library. On 15 February 2020, the Jamia Coordination Committee released a CCTV footage which confirms that indeed police and para-military personnel entered into the research scholar section of the library and randomly beat up students who can be seen sitting and reading at their respective seats. Another video posted by Maktoob Media an online media platform, shows that the police broke the door of the PG reading room of the library and started beating the students. The students could be seen pleading with the police not to beat them but it was in vain. The police brutality and vandalism continued and at the end the police can be seen damaging the CCTV which was capturing the incidents. The Quint released another video on 17 February 2020, where it can be seen that police and para-military personnel entered the library and vandalised, breaking chairs and reading desk and damaging CCTVs. It can also be seen that the police lathi charged the frightened students who were trying their best to hide to save themselves from such brutality.

Firing 
On 16 December 2019, two students of Jamia were admitted to the Safdarjung Hospital with bullet injuries received during the protests on 15 December. One of the victims, M. Tamin stated that he was not participating in the protest and was passing through the area on a motorcycle, when police suddenly started caning the protesters and he was shot in the leg by police from point blank range. The doctors treating him stated that the wounds were gunshot wounds. The police stated that they were investigating the allegations of gunshot.

Aftermath 
The university shut down until 5 January 2020 and the residents were asked to leave the campus.

Investigation 
On 12 January, vice-chancellor Najma Akhtar said that she would approach the court to file an FIR against the Delhi Police. However, no FIR is filed yet. She also assured students that campus security would be improved. An internal probe by the Delhi police revealed that at least three bullets were fired during the crackdown.

On 30 January, Delhi Police identified photos of 69 people suspected of being involved in violence and rioting during the protest against CAA in Jamia Nagar.

Reactions 
Some celebrity alumni of Jamia, including Shah Rukh Khan, Virender Sehwag, and Kabir Khan were criticized for the failure to condemn the crackdown on their alma mater.

Protests 

Protests were held in solidarity with Jamia students in several major universities across the subcontinent, including IIM Ahmedabad, Banaras Hindu University, Dhaka University, and IIT Bombay. Over 400 scholars from US universities including Harvard, Yale, Columbia, Stanford, and Tufts issued a joint statement expressing solidarity with Jamia students.

Further violence 
A juvenile Hindu nationalist opened fire at a protest at the Jamia Millia Islamia, injuring one student. The event happened on the 72nd anniversary of the assassination of Mahatma Gandhi, also by a Hindu nationalist. He was arrested and charged with attempted murder. The man shouted slogans of "Jai Shri Ram" (Victory to Lord Rama) and "Delhi Police Zindabad" (Long live Delhi police). Before opening fire at the protestors, the attacker shouted "Kisko chahiye Azadi? Main Dunga Azadi" (Who wants freedom? I will give freedom).

On 2 February 2020, late at night when people were protesting, two unidentified men fired shots near gate 5 of the University, the third attack in the area after 2nd attack during the Shaheen Bagh protest. Though there was no casualty reported.

See also 
 Campus violence in India
 JNU attack

References

Video links 
 Interview with a victim who was blinded in one eye during the attack by The Caravan magazine. 
 CCTV footage of police brutality in old reading hall, M.A/MPhill section Jamia Library by Jamia Coordination Committee (JCC).
 Extended footage of Delhi Police brutality in PG reading room, Jamia Library by The Maktoob Media.
 Footage from Jamia Library shows cops trying to vandalise CCTV by The Quint
 Jamia Students Take Cover In Library As Police Fire Tear Gas by The NDTV
 Media misreport wallet as ‘stone’ in student's hand by the AltNews.in

Violence at universities and colleges
Attacks in India in 2019
2019 in India
Citizenship Amendment Act protests
2010s in Delhi
Police misconduct in India
Human rights abuses in India
Police brutality in India
Jamia Millia Islamia
Attacks in India